Tianqiao District is one of 10 urban districts of the prefecture-level city of Jinan, the capital of Shandong Province in East China, forming part of the city's urban core. It borders Jiyang County to the north, Licheng District to the east, Lixia District to the southeast, Shizhong District to the south, Huaiyin District to the southwest,  as well as the prefecture-level city of Dezhou to the northwest.

Administrative divisions
As 2012, this district is divided to 14 subdistricts and 1 town.
Subdistricts

Towns
Sangzidian

Economy 

Everbright International has its Jinan office in Tianqiao District.

References

External links
 Official home page

Tianqiao
Jinan